Liquid armour is a material under research by defense institutions and universities around the world including the United States Army Research Laboratory (ARL). Some of the earliest research in this area was performed at Massachusetts Institute of Technology and University of Delaware in 2003. Liquid armor was initially presented as a way to increase the survivability of soldiers in high risk roles  while retaining their mobility, as reported by NPR in an interview with MIT professors and a U.S. admiral.

Typically, it consists of Kevlar that is soaked in one of two fluids - either a shear thickening fluid or a magnetorheological fluid. Both these fluids show the behavior of a non-Newtonian fluid, behaving like a liquid under low or normal pressure and solid under higher pressure or applied fields.
The shear thickening fluid is normally made with polyethylene glycol and the solid part is made of nano-particles of silica. This liquid is soaked into all the layers of a Kevlar vest.
The magnetorheological fluid consists of magnetic (typically iron) particles in a carrier fluid such as oil. They respond to magnetic fields by increasing in viscosity dramatically, almost acting like a solid.

BAE Systems has been researching a similar Kevlar vest with a fluid between layers of polymer. BAE acquired the US research company Armor Holdings, who were doing research based on suspensions of silica particles.

Fluids used for this purpose are non-Newtonian. 
Shear thickening fluids (or STF), which are the same as dilatants, are one type of non-Newtonian fluid. Magnetorheological fluids (or MRF) are another type of non-Newtonian fluid that also belong to a class of fluids known as smart fluids.

Tests and experiments

Ballistic test 
During a ballistic test, the requirement is that the projectile would stop, and its penetration should not surpass . In 2003, an experiment performed by Lee showed much about the ballistic properties of liquid armor. The experiment showed the strength difference between standard Kevlar and STF-Kevlar. It was observed that the STF could do an extreme, sharp increase in viscosity, and as a result, it turned back to a flowable liquid almost as fast as it turned solid. These experiments visually showed that liquid armor has ballistic properties that are greater than neat fabrics. It was displayed that only four layers of STF-Kevlar offer the same amount of protection that ten layers of standard Kevlar offers. Additionally, it was discovered that STF-Kevlar has little to no increase in thickness and stiffness.

Tower drop stab test 
In the tower drop stab test, two tests are performed on neat Kevlar and STF-Kevlar samples. The test proved that the STF-Kevlar was able to show a result that was slightly better than the neat Kevlar. The samples demonstrated similar depth, but the neat Kevlar displayed more yarn-pullout and yarn splaying. Observers found that the STF-Kevlar was able to withstand the stab test better than the neat Kevlar. Later on, in a spike impactor stab test, the STF-Kevlar demonstrated significantly better results than the neat Kevlar. While in another spike impactor stab test, the STF-Kevlar showed small amounts of distortion in the fabric weave.

Quasi-static test 
In the quasi-static test, the knife blade impactor penetrated both the neat Kevlar sample and the STF-Kevlar sample. However, the STF-Kevlar sample demonstrated a smaller damage zone and fewer severed yarns. The explanation is that the STF-Kevlar sample faced a significantly greater load. It presents itself as that the STF-Kevlar was able to more efficiently resist the stab, and it became very evident because it showed its performance visually. This information became clearer when in another test, the STF-Kevlar and neat Kevlar showed very different results. The neat Kevlar was penetrated at only a small displacement, showing that neat Kevlar could not effectively resist penetration. Meanwhile, the STF-Kevlar showed no signs of penetration even when it was set at the maximum displacement of 33 mm.

Flexibility test 
The most notable feature of liquid armor is its ability to stay flexible while providing reasonable amounts of protection. The test is performed by weighing down angles between an original position and a new position to determine the flexibility of Kevlar samples. While in the experiment, it demonstrated that STF-Kevlar had a more vital blunt force protection. The test shows that STF-Kevlar had flexibility but also protection from blunt force.

References

External links
http://paultheengineer.com/print/shearfluidpaper.pdf
"Liquid armor": Protective fabrics utilizing shear thickening fluids

Body armor